The Women's  Freestyle Relay event at the 2007 Pan American Games took place at the Maria Lenk Aquatic Park in Rio de Janeiro, Brazil, with the final being swum on July 19.

Medalists

Results

Finals

Preliminaries
The heats was held on July 18.

References
For the Record, Swimming World Magazine, September 2007 (p. 48+49)
2007 Pan Am Games results: Women: 4x100m Freestyle Relay from sports123.com; retrieved 2009-08-12.

Freestyle Relay, Women's 4x100
2007 in women's swimming